Bern Township is one of the fourteen townships of Athens County, Ohio, United States. The 2010 census found 572 people in the township.

Geography
Located in the northeastern corner of the county, it borders the following townships:
Marion Township, Morgan County - north
Wesley Township, Washington County - east
Decatur Township, Washington County - southeast corner
Rome Township - south
Canaan Township - southwest corner
Ames Township - west
Homer Township, Morgan County - northwest corner

Communities
Sharpsburg lies in the township's northwest corner and is home to the township's office.

Name and history
Bern Township was organized in 1828, having previously been part of Ames Township. Bern Township is mostly coterminous with survey township 7 North, Range 12 West. Six sections forming the easternmost tier of the survey township were transferred in 1807 to Washington County.

It is the only Bern Township statewide, although there is a Berne Township in Fairfield County.

Government
The township is governed by a three-member board of trustees, who are elected in November of odd-numbered years to a four-year term beginning on the following January 1. Two are elected in the year after the presidential election and one is elected in the year before it. There is also an elected township fiscal officer, who serves a four-year term beginning on April 1 of the year after the election, which is held in November of the year before the presidential election. Vacancies in the fiscal officership or on the board of trustees are filled by the remaining trustees.

References

External links
County website

Townships in Athens County, Ohio
1828 establishments in Ohio
Populated places established in 1828
Townships in Ohio